The Downshire Cliffs are a line of precipitous basalt cliffs rising to 2,000 m above the Ross Sea and forming much of the eastern side of the Adare Peninsula, along the Borchgrevink Coast of northern Victoria Land, Antarctica. The nearest permanent research stations are the Italian Mario Zucchelli and South Korean Jang Bogo Stations some 400 km to the south in Terra Nova Bay.

Discovery and naming
In 1841 Captain James Clark Ross applied the name "Cape Downshire" to a part of these cliffs. He did so at the request of Commander Francis Crozier of HMS Downshire. No prominent cape exists here and, for the sake of historical continuity, the name was reapplied to the cliffs.

Important Bird Area
A 243 ha site comprising the ice-free slopes beneath the cliffs has been designated an Important Bird Area (IBA) by BirdLife International because it supports about 20,000 breeding pairs of Adélie penguinss, the number based on counts carried out over five seasons sampled between 1981 and 2012.

References

External links 

Important Bird Areas of Antarctica
Penguin colonies
Cliffs of Victoria Land
Borchgrevink Coast